Escalada is a Brazilian telenovela produced and broadcast by TV Globo. It premiered on 6 January 1975 and ended on 23 August 1975, with a total of 197 episodes in Black and white. It's the fifteenth "novela das oito" to be aired on the timeslot. It is created and written by Lauro César Muniz and directed by Régis Cardoso.

Cast 
 Tarcísio Meira - Antônio Dias
 Renée de Vielmond - Marina
 Susana Vieira - Cândida
 Milton Moraes - Armando Magalhães
 Otávio Augusto - Horácio Bastos
 Ney Latorraca - Felipe
 Cecil Thiré - Paschoal Barreto
 Ênio Santos - Artur Freitas Ribeiro
 Nathália Timberg - Fernanda Soares
 Lutero Luiz - Professor Tadeu Oliveira / Miguel Pereira
 Oswaldo Louzada - Gabino Alcântara Magalhães
 Gilda Sarmento - Leonor
 Myriam Pérsia - Celina
 Roberto Pirillo - Sérgio
 Nelson Dantas - Zé Sereno
 André Valli - Zoreia
 Antônio Victor - Father Leopoldo
 Tessy Callado - Marieta
 Jorge Coutinho - Inspector Bastião
 Suzy Arruda - Querubina
 Zeny Pereira - Braulina
 Carlos Duval - Gomes
 Sérgio de Oliveira - Dom Garpar Vieira Sobral
 Paulo Ramos - Dr. Mário
 Rosamaria Murtinho - Arlete
 Débora Duarte - Inês
 Rubens de Falco - Comendador
 Mário Lago - Belmiro Silva
 Rogério Fróes - Dr. Estêvão
 Elza Gomes - Dona Eulália
 Zanoni Ferrite - Valdir Costa
 Sérgio Britto - Valério Facchini
 Sandra Bréa - Roberta
 Leonardo Villar - Alberto Silveira
 Francisco Moreno - Chico Dias
 Maria Helena - Dias Odete
 Rosita Thomaz Lopes - Noêmia
 Vera Gimenez - Carla
 Maria Zilda Bethlem - Ester
 Maria Teresa Barroso - Dona Rosa
 Alfredo Murphy - Candango
 Júlio César - Ricardo (child)
 Cristina Bittencourt - Vivian (child)
 Mário Cardoso - Ricardo
 Kátia D'Angelo - Vivian
 Tony Ferreira - Bruno Carlucci
 Reny de Oliveira - Paula
 Heloísa Helena - Celeste
 Henriqueta Brieba - Vó Dita
 Patricia Bueno - Clementina

References 

TV Globo telenovelas
1975 telenovelas
Brazilian telenovelas
1975 Brazilian television series debuts
1975 Brazilian television series endings
Portuguese-language telenovelas